Rayman Mini is a platform video game developed by Ubisoft Montpellier and Pastagames and published by Ubisoft released on September 19, 2019 for iOS and macOS through Apple Arcade.

Description
Rayman Mini is centered on Rayman who has been shrunk to the size of an ant. The players have to pass through scenarios (48 levels at total), full of different obstacles and enemies, with the goal to undo the spell. The game gives the opportunity to choose between three characters, (Rayman, Barbara, or Globox), and unlock different costumes to customize them.

Development
Michel Ancel said he "felt the right opportunity to immerse the player in a macro-photographic universe", giving this angle to him the idea to create a Rayman mini-universe, and he described the level design as the harder part of the game's development, because the running game feature. Ancel promised that future updates would arrive after Rayman Mini'''s launch, wanting to give it a founding role for the brand on the Apple Arcade service.

Reception
Jerome Joffard of Jeuxvideo describes the game as beautiful and effective, praising the levels and soundtrack as high quality. The author added that the gameplay was enhanced in comparison of Rayman Adventures, where the difficulty was precisely calculated, but maintained old good features unaltered. The lack of new mechanics, new characters and the re-play bonus content were criticized.Multiplayer.it'' exalts the comfort of its easygoing control, that allows to put aside the need for some external control, and refers to the animations as worthy of a cartoon. However, the game was talked about as an antiquated platform game with uninspired design and moderate difficulty.

References

External links

 

2019 video games
Rayman
Ubisoft games
Platform games
IOS games
MacOS games
Apple Arcade games
Video games developed in France